The Future Air Defender (FuAD) is a joint program from the Dutch and German navies to find a common replacement for both the  and the .

History 

This program isn't the first time that the Netherlands and Germany have worked together on a new frigate class. They also collaborated on the classes that this program is set to replace in the Trilateral Frigate Cooperation together with Spain. Back then this was mostly aimed towards sensors with each country developing their own hull. This resulted in the common use of the SMART-L and APAR radars. And more recently the Dutch Damen Group is working together with a German consortium (including Lürssen and Blohm+Voss) on the F126 frigate.

In November 2021 it was announced that Germany chose to use radar from Hensoldt. This was following Germany's decision to label the construction of surface ships among key technologies. However, this decision strains the cooperation between Germany and The Netherland because part of the agreement was to develop radar and weaponsystems together. Also the fact that the two countries have different requirements for the size of internal spaces like stairs causes a difficulty in the cooperation.

During a defence meeting on November 7, 2022, with the Tweede kamer questions were raised by MP Peter Valstar on the future of the cooperation, pointing towards the German navy leaning into the idea of acquiring a similar ship like the American , which in first instance was not designed as an air defence frigate. New Secretary for Defence, Christophe van der Maat, said that there are still multiple scenarios possible with or without German participation. To avoid a permanent break in the partnership a project organization was formed to set up a directory of requirements and building rules both countries can accept.

Potential partners 
Christophe van der Maat said in the same November 7 defence meeting that another possibility to move forward with the FuAD program is to look for additional partners. Most likely he referred to Scandinavian countries with similar needs. This class has a comparable role and sensor suite to De Zeven Provinciën. Commander of the Royal Netherlands Navy René Tas repeated this ambition the next day at the opening of a conference at the TU Delft. Tas elaborated by saying multiple letters of intent were signed with Denmark, Finland, Germany, Norway and Sweden to, in terms of naval ship building, collaborate on future weapon systems. The Dutch navy will now investigate if one or more of these countries is interested to participate.

See also
 Future of the Royal Netherlands Navy

Citations 

Proposed ships of the Royal Netherlands Navy
German Navy
Frigate classes